Shirel Joan Ortiz Aparicio, (born 4 December 1995) is a Panamanian model and beauty pageant titleholder who winner of the Miss International Panamá 2018 title for Miss International 2018 contest. She represented Panama at Miss International 2018.

Personal life
Shirel  who represented the Panama Capital at the national pageant is an International Commerce and Logistics student.

Pageantry

Señorita Panamá 2018
Ortiz is 5 ft 9 1⁄2 in (1.77 m) tall, and competed in the national beauty pageant Señorita Panamá 2018. She was crowned as Miss International Panama 2018 was held at the Roberto Durán Arena in Panama City on 7 June 2018. She represented the state of Panama Centro.

Miss International 2018
She represented Panamá in the 2018 Miss International pageant.

See also
 Señorita Panamá 2018
 Rosa Montezuma

References

External links
Panamá 2018 official website

1995 births
Living people
Miss International 2018 delegates
Panamanian beauty pageant winners
Panamanian female models
Señorita Panamá